Pauls is a surname, and may refer to:

 Gastón Pauls (born 1972), Argentine actor
 Johann Pauls (1908–1946), German SS concentration camp officer executed for war crimes
 Nicolás Pauls (born 1975), Argentine film and television actor
 Raimonds Pauls (born 1936), Latvian composer and piano player